Mia Hermansson-Högdahl (born 6 May 1965) is a Swedish team handball player. She was voted World Handball Player of the Year 1994 by the International Handball Federation.

Hermansson-Högdahl has played 222 matches for the Swedish national team, and scored 1100 times. She was voted into the World team in 1987, 1991 and 1994. As a club player she won the Women's EHF Champions League with Hypo Niederösterreich two times (1993/94, 1994/95).

She is the assistant coach of the Norwegian women's handball team since 2010.

Her daughter, Moa Högdahl is also a professional handballer, playing for Viborg HK and the Norwegian national handball team.

References

External links

|-

1965 births
Living people
Swedish female handball players
Swedish handball coaches
Handball players from Gothenburg
20th-century Swedish women